is a Japanese football player.

Playing career
Shibata was born in Nagasaki Prefecture on May 26, 2001. He joined J1 League club Shonan Bellmare from youth team in 2018.

References

External links

2001 births
Living people
Association football people from Nagasaki Prefecture
Japanese footballers
J1 League players
Shonan Bellmare players
Association football midfielders